Robert Darin Houston (born October 26, 1967) is a former American football linebacker who played in the National Football League (NFL).

Houston played college football at North Carolina State University.  He was selected by the Green Bay Packers in the 3rd round (75th overall pick) of the 1990 NFL Draft. He played for the Packers (1990), the Falcons (1990), the New York Jets (1991–1996), the Kansas City Chiefs (1997), the San Diego Chargers (1997) and the Minnesota Vikings.

1967 births
Living people
Players of American football from Washington, D.C.
American football linebackers
NC State Wolfpack football players
Green Bay Packers players
New York Jets players
Kansas City Chiefs players
San Diego Chargers players
Minnesota Vikings players